Tomáš Goláň (born 1 December 1968 in Vsetín) is a Czech tax adviser. He was elected member of Senate during 2018 by-election for Zlín seat and reelected during 2020 Czech Senate election.

Biography
He studied at the Faculty of Business and Economics of Mendel University. He worked as an economist at Zlín until 1993 when he became tax advisor.

He became widely known for his fight against Preliminary injunctions by Financial administration. He received award from Deník Referendum which chose him the Second Person of 2017.

Political career
On 22 March 2018, he announced his candidacy in a by-election for Zlín seat in 2018. Goláň was nominated by Senátor 21. Goláň was initially viewed as an Underdog in the election but managed to advance to runoff where he faced Michaela Blahová. He defeated Blahová when he received  over 53% of votes and became new senator. He then joined newly formed Senate group of Senátor 21. Shortly after Goláň's reelection in 2020 he joined Civic Democratic Party and its Senate group (ODS+TOP09 Senate group).

References

1968 births
Living people
People from Vsetín
Members of the Senate of the Czech Republic
Civic Democratic Party (Czech Republic) Senators
Mendel University Brno alumni
Senator 21 Senators